Marielle Amant (born 9 December 1989) is a French basketball player for ESB Villeneuve-d’Ascq and the French national team, where she participated at the 2014 FIBA World Championship.

References

1989 births
Living people
Basketball players at the 2016 Summer Olympics
Centers (basketball)
French women's basketball players
Martiniquais women's basketball players
Olympic basketball players of France
People from Le Lamentin
France women's national basketball team players